Saleh Al-Kaany (Arabic: صالح الكعاني; born 6 March 1998) is a Qatari footballer who plays as a forward.

Career

El Jaish
Al-Kaany started his career at El Jaish and is a product of the El Jaish's youth system.

Al-Duhail
He was playing with El Jaish and after merging El Jaish and Lekhwiya clubs under the name Al-Duhail he was joined to Al-Duhail.

Umm Salal
On Season 2019, left Al-Duhail and signed with Umm Salal. On 25 July 2020, Al-Kaany made his professional debut for Umm Salal against Al-Duhail in the Pro League .

Career statistics

Club

Notes

References

External links
 

1997 births
Living people
Qatari footballers
El Jaish SC players
Al-Duhail SC players
Umm Salal SC players
Qatar Stars League players
Association football forwards